Wilton Andrés Veras (born January 19, 1978) is a former backup third baseman in Major League Baseball who played from 1999 to 2000 for the Boston Red Sox. Listed at 6' 2", 198 lb., he batted and threw right-handed. He once held the Taiwanese Chinese Professional Baseball League single season record for hits, attaining 176 in 2009 for the Sinon Bulls. The record was broken in 2016 by Lamigo Monkeys rookie Wang Po-Jung's 200.

In a two-season career, Veras was a .262 hitter (74-for-282) with two home runs and 27 RBI in 85 games, including 35 runs, 12 doubles and two triples.

Veras also played in the Red Sox and Brewers's minor league systems (1995–2003), the New Jersey Jackals of the Northeast/Can-Am leagues  (2004/2006–2007), the Mexican League's Dorados de Chihuahua (2008) and CPBL's Macoto Cobras (2005), Chinatrust Whales (2008), and Sinon Bulls (2009–10). In 12 minor league seasons, he hit .272 with 67 home runs and 570 RBI in 1163 games.

See also
Players from Dominican Republic in Major League Baseball

External links

1978 births
Living people
Boston Red Sox players
Dorados de Chihuahua players
Dominican Republic expatriate baseball players in Mexico
Dominican Republic expatriate baseball players in Taiwan
Dominican Republic expatriate baseball players in the United States
Estrellas Orientales players
Gulf Coast Red Sox players
Indianapolis Indians players

Leones del Escogido players
Lowell Spinners players
Major League Baseball third basemen
Major League Baseball players from the Dominican Republic
Michigan Battle Cats players
Mexican League baseball first basemen
Mexican League baseball third basemen
New Jersey Jackals players
Pawtucket Red Sox players
Trenton Thunder players
Vaqueros Laguna players
Macoto Cobras players
Chinatrust Whales players
Sinon Bulls players